The Trigonopterygoidea are an insect superfamily in the Orthoptera: Caelifera. Sometimes described as leaf grasshoppers, American species in the Xyronotidae have also been called razor-backed bush-hoppers.

Families and distribution
The Orthoptera Species File lists two families:
 Trigonopterygidae Walker, 1870: found in south and south-east Asia
 subfamily Borneacridinae Kevan, 1952
 subfamily Trigonopteryginae Walker, 1870
 Xyronotidae Bolívar, 1909: found in Central America north to Mexico
 genus Axyronotus Dirsh & Mason, 1979
 genus Xyronotus Saussure, 1884

References

External links
 
 
 
 ITIS: Trigonopterygoidea
 ADW: Trigonopterygoidea

Insect superfamilies
Caelifera
Orthoptera of Asia
Orthoptera of North America